"No Friends in the Industry" is a song by Canadian rapper Drake. Released on September 3, 2021, as the twelfth track from Drake's sixth studio album Certified Lover Boy.

Charts

Weekly charts

Year-end charts

References

2021 songs
Drake (musician) songs
Songs written by Drake (musician)
Songs written by Oz (record producer)
Song recordings produced by Vinylz